is an arm of the western end of the Seto Inland Sea of Japan.

Beppu Bay is located on the northeast coast of Kyushu in Ōita Prefecture. The city of Ōita lies on its southern coast and the city of Beppu at its western end.

Notes

Bays of Kyushu
Landforms of Ōita Prefecture